Lucas Henrique Frigeri (born 15 June 1989) is a Brazilian footballer who plays as a goalkeeper for Novorizontino.

Honours
Avaí
Campeonato Catarinense: 2019, 2021

References

External links

1989 births
Living people
People from Catanduva
Brazilian footballers
Association football goalkeepers
Campeonato Brasileiro Série A players
Campeonato Brasileiro Série B players
Campeonato Brasileiro Série C players
Grêmio Catanduvense de Futebol players
Associação Atlética Internacional (Limeira) players
Luverdense Esporte Clube players
Rio Claro Futebol Clube players
Associação Desportiva São Caetano players
Atlético Clube Goianiense players
Centro Sportivo Alagoano players
Avaí FC players
Grêmio Novorizontino players
Footballers from São Paulo (state)